Harriet Harman's second Shadow Cabinet was formed by Harriet Harman in 2015 during her second period as Acting Leader of the Labour Party. She assumed this role after Ed Miliband resigned as party leader (and Leader of the Opposition) and announced she would continue until a new leader was elected on 12 September 2015. Miliband's resignation followed the party's defeat at the 2015 general election.

Creation
On 11 May 2015, Harman announced the make-up of her Shadow Cabinet. Most members of Miliband's last shadow cabinet continued in their roles with the following exceptions:

 Ed Balls was defeated in his former Morley and Outwood constituency, so was replaced as Shadow Chancellor by Chris Leslie. 
 Douglas Alexander was defeated in his former Paisley and Renfrewshire South constituency, so was replaced as Shadow Foreign Secretary by Hilary Benn
 Margaret Curran was defeated in her former Glasgow East constituency, so was replaced as Shadow Secretary of State for Scotland by Ian Murray, the party's only remaining MP in Scotland. 
 Shabana Mahmood replaced Leslie as Shadow Chief Secretary to the Treasury
 Emma Reynolds replaced Benn as Shadow Secretary of State for Communities and Local Government
 Chris Bryant became Shadow Secretary of State for Culture, Media and Sport, a post previously held by Harman in addition to the deputy leadership.
 Sadiq Khan stepped down from the Shadow Cabinet, and was replaced as Shadow Secretary of State for Justice and Shadow Lord Chancellor by Lord Falconer

Additionally, Benn was given responsibility for the despatch box during deputy PMQs against George Osborne in his role as First Secretary of State.

Harman's first shadow cabinet had been formed during a similar period as pro tempore leader following Gordon Brown's resignation following the 2010 general election.

Changes
On 13 May 2015, Baroness Royall of Blaisdon announced that she would be stepping down as Leader of the Opposition in the House of Lords. Baroness Smith of Basildon was elected unopposed as her successor by Labour peers on 27 May 2015, and thus took her place in the shadow cabinet.

In May 2015, Rachel Reeves went on maternity leave ahead of the birth of her second child. Stephen Timms became Acting Shadow Secretary of State for Work and Pensions.

Members of the Shadow Cabinet

Sources: Parliament.uk
Labour Shadow Cabinet

References

Harman
Official Opposition (United Kingdom)
2015 establishments in the United Kingdom
Cabinets disestablished in 2015
British shadow cabinets
2015 in British politics
Harriet Harman